Genc Ruli (born April 11, 1958) is an Albanian politician. A founder member of the Democratic Party of Albania (1991), ex-Minister of Finance (July 1991-December 1991), ex-Minister of Finance and Economy (March 1992-November 1993), ex-Minister of Economy, Trade and Energy (September 2005-September 2009) and ex-Minister of Agriculture, Food and Consumer Protection (September 2009 – September 2013).

Ruli holds a bachelor's degree in economics and a bachelor's degree in law from the University of Tirana. He holds a PhD in economics from the Faculty of Economics, University of Tirana. Ruli is given the title professor from the Faculty of Economics, University of Tirana (1994).
He has served for 23 years as a professor of finance and accounting in the Faculty of Economics, at the University of Tirana from 1982 to 2005.
Ruli resigned from his position as finance minister on 9 November 1993, following allegations of corruption.  as a result of a conflict with the president of Albania at that time, Mr. Sali Berisha. Mr. Ruli forcefully denied the accusations and they were never verified. Further on, he became minister in two of Berisha's governments, from 2005 to 2013. 
Ruli has also been member the Albania's National Assembly (Parliament) during four legislatures: 1991– 1992; 1992–1996; 2005–2009; 2009–2013. 
After leaving politics from 1996 to 2005, Ruli established Institute of Contemporary Studies, one of the most prestigious think tanks in Albania, where he was founder and president.
Ruli has been engaged in many national and international activities, with well-known organizations and institutions. He has hold various positions, such as chairman of the supervisory board of the Insurance Institute (INSIG); chairman of the Parliamentary Commission of Economy and Finance; EBRD Governor for Albania; member and vice president of the Albanian Olympic Committee etc.
Ruli has written several publications in the areas of economics and public policies.

References
Notes

Sources
Biographical data from the Albanian government (in Albanian)

1958 births
Living people
Democratic Party of Albania politicians
Politicians from Tirana
University of Tirana alumni
Government ministers of Albania
Finance ministers of Albania
Agriculture ministers of Albania
21st-century Albanian politicians